Chevalier is a 2022 American biographical drama film directed by Stephen Williams and written by Stefani Robinson. It is based on the life of the titular French-Caribbean musician Joseph Bologne, Chevalier de Saint-Georges, played by Kelvin Harrison Jr.. The film also stars Samara Weaving, Lucy Boynton, Marton Csokas, Alex Fitzalan, and Minnie Driver. 

Chevalier had its world premiere at the 2022 Toronto International Film Festival on September 11, 2022, and is scheduled to be released in the United States on April 21, 2023, by Searchlight Pictures.

Plot
The rise and resurgence of Chevalier de Saint-Georges, a French-Caribbean violinist and composer who rose to fame through his musical prodigy. But a complicated love life and the racism of the ancien régime leads to a falling out with Marie Antoinette, and Saint-Georges realizes that things must change.

Cast
 Kelvin Harrison Jr. as Joseph Bologne, Chevalier de Saint-Georges
 Samara Weaving as Marie-Josephine de Montalembert
 Lucy Boynton as Marie Antoinette
 Marton Csokas as Marc René, marquis de Montalembert
 Alex Fitzalan as Louis Philippe II, Duke of Orléans
 Minnie Driver as Marie-Madeleine Guimard

Production
On June 30, 2020, it was announced that Searchlight Pictures had bought a feature pitch from Atlantas Stefani Robinson for Chevalier de Saint-Georges, a biopic about the musician of the same name, with Stephen Williams attached to direct. On March 31, 2021, it was announced that Kelvin Harrison Jr. was cast in the lead role of Saint-Georges. On July 8, 2021, Samara Weaving joined the cast as the female lead. The following month, Lucy Boynton and Minnie Driver were added to the main cast, with Alex Fitzalan cast in a supporting role and the film's title shortened to Chevalier.

Principal photography began on September 7, 2021, in Prague, Czech Republic and filming ended in November 2021.

Release
It had its world premiere at the 2022 Toronto International Film Festival on September 11, 2022. Originally set to released in theaters on April 7, 2023, the date was pushed back to April 21, 2023.

Reception 
On review aggregation website Rotten Tomatoes, the film has an approval rating of 94% based on 18 reviews, with an average rating of 6.6/10. On Metacritic, the film has a weighted average score of 67 out of 100, based on reviews from 8 critics, indicating "generally favorable reviews."

References

External links
 
 

2022 biographical drama films
American biographical drama films
American films based on actual events
Biographical films about musicians
Drama films based on actual events
Films about Marie Antoinette
Films about marriage
Films about music and musicians
Films about society
Films scored by Kris Bowers
Films set in France
Films set in the 18th century
Films shot in Prague
Searchlight Pictures films
2020s American films
2020s English-language films
African-American films